The Stolen Battle is a 1972 East-German/Czechoslovak film based on the life of Christian Andreas Käsebier. The film starred Manfred Krug as Käsebier and Josef Kemr as Karl von Lothringen.

References

External links
 

1972 films
Czechoslovak comedy films
East German films
Czech comedy films
Cultural depictions of Frederick the Great
Films set in the 1750s
Seven Years' War films
1970s German films
1970s Czech films
German comedy films